The following is a list of Teen Choice Award winners and nominees for Choice Music - Love Song. One Direction receives the most wins with 5.

Winners and nominees

1999

2000s

2010s

References

Pop music awards
Love Song